Graham Moseley (born 16 November 1953) is an English former professional footballer who played in the 1983 FA Cup Final with Brighton & Hove Albion.

Moseley began his career as an apprentice at Blackburn Rovers, and also played for Derby County, Aston Villa, Walsall, Brighton & Hove Albion and Cardiff City.

References

1953 births
Living people
Footballers from Manchester
English footballers
Association football goalkeepers
Blackburn Rovers F.C. players
Derby County F.C. players
Aston Villa F.C. players
Walsall F.C. players
Brighton & Hove Albion F.C. players
Cardiff City F.C. players
English Football League players
FA Cup Final players